Aeropesca Colombia Flight 221 was an internal scheduled passenger flight from Florencia Airport to Neiva Airport in Colombia. On 26 August 1981 it was being operated by a Vickers Viscount turboprop airliner registered in Colombia as HK-1320 when it collided with Mount Santa Elana, an Andean mountain peak, destroying the aircraft and killing all 50 on board.

Investigation
The investigation by the Colombian authorities concluded the probable cause was "continuing VFR in meteorological conditions below the minimum laid down in the Manual of Colombian air routes".

Aircraft
The aircraft was a four-engined Vickers Viscount 745D turboprop airliner registered HK-1320 with Vickers construction number 112, it first flew on 22 February 1956 in the United Kingdom and was delivered to Capital Airlines in the United States on 3 March 1956. After service with Capital, Austrian Airlines and Aloha Airlines it was bought by Aeropesca Colombia in 1971.

References
Notes

Bibliography

External links
Aviation Safety Network report

Aviation accidents and incidents in 1981
Aviation accidents and incidents in Colombia
Accidents and incidents involving the Vickers Viscount
Aviation accidents and incidents involving controlled flight into terrain
1981 in Colombia
August 1981 events in South America